
Gmina Kolbudy is a rural gmina (administrative district) in Gdańsk County, Pomeranian Voivodeship, in northern Poland.

It is divided into 20 sołectwos. 

Its largest and most important village is Kowale.

Villages

History 
To 1920, the terrain was divided between the counties of Kartuzy and Gdańsk. Similar to the gmina, Kolbudy was also divided into two — The west was called Higher Kolbudy and was owned by Kartuzy while the east was called Lower Kolbudy and was owned by Gdańsk. The river Radunia marked the border.

After the Free City of Danzig became independent, the area was incorporated into it due to a German majority as part of Danziger Höhe. After Germany attacked Poland and annexed the free city, it became part of Nazi Germany until the Soviets liberated it in the East Pomeranian offensive.

On 30 March 1945 the Gdańsk Voivodeship was created and the gmina was incorporated into it. 20 December 1998 Higher and Upper Kolbudy were merged. In 1999 Gmina Kolbudy became part of the newly created Pomeranian Voivodeship, which it is part of to this day.

Neighbouring gminas
Gmina Kolbudy is bordered by the city of Gdańsk and by the gminas of Pruszcz Gdański, Przywidz, Trąbki Wielkie and Żukowo.

References

Kolbudy
Gdańsk County